Apamea lignicolora, the wood-coloured Quaker or wood-coloured apamea, is a moth of the family Noctuidae. The species was first described by Achille Guenée in 1852. It is native to North America, where it is distributed across much of Canada and the United States.

The wingspan is 45 to 50 mm. The moth is reddish brown with darker patches and a W-shaped mark on the forewings. It is fringed with red and brown. The hindwings are more brown in colour. The male genitalia has robust ampullae and digitus. The moth flies from May to August depending on the location.

The larva feeds on a various grasses, including couch grass (Agropyron repens).

Subspecies
Apamea lignicolora lignicolora
Apamea lignicolora quaesita

Apamea atriclava was formerly considered a subspecies of A. lignicolora.

References

External links

Apamea (moth)
Moths of North America
Moths described in 1852
Taxa named by Achille Guenée